Panj is a city in southern Tajikistan which is situated on the Afghan border, some  south of the capital Dushanbe. It is located along the north bank of the river Panj, from which it derives its name. The population of the town is 12,500 (January 2020 estimate).

In Soviet times Panj was known as Baumanabad, and later as Kirovabad. It has also been known as Pyandj, Pyandzh, Kirowabad, Sarai, Sarai-Kamar, Saray Komar, and Saray-Kamar.  

It is not to be confused with the town of Dusti which has been known as Pyandj, Pyandzh, Molotovabad, Dŭsty, and Dusti.

References

Populated places in Khatlon Region